Heinz-Jürgen Bothe (born 5 November 1941) is a German rower who competed for East Germany in the 1968 Summer Olympics.

He was born in Berlin.

In 1968 he and his partner Jörg Lucke won the gold medal in the coxless pair event.

References

External links
 

1941 births
Living people
Rowers from Berlin
Olympic rowers of East Germany
Rowers at the 1968 Summer Olympics
Rowers at the 1972 Summer Olympics
Olympic gold medalists for East Germany
Olympic medalists in rowing
East German male rowers
World Rowing Championships medalists for East Germany
Medalists at the 1968 Summer Olympics
European Rowing Championships medalists